Anzorey is a rural locality (a selo) and the administrative center of Leskensky District of the Kabardino-Balkar Republic, Russia. Population:

References

Notes

Sources

Rural localities in Kabardino-Balkaria